Bausa is a surname. Notable people with the surname include:

Bausa (rapper) (born 1989), German rapper and singer
Agostino Bausa (1821–1899), Italian cardinal of the Roman Catholic Church
Gregorio Bausá (1590–1656), Spanish painter of the Baroque period